Yana Gennadyevna Vorona (sometimes transliterated Iana) (born 28 December 2004) is a Russian artistic gymnast. She was a member of the team who won gold at the 2019 European Youth Olympic Festival and was the alternate for the team who won gold at the inaugural Junior World Championships.

Early life
Yana Vorona was born in Voronezh, Russia in 2004.

Gymnastics career

Junior

2017–18
Vorona competed at the 2017 Russian National Championships in April in the KMS division. She placed fifth in the all-around behind Olga Astafyeva, Irina Komnova, Elena Gerasimova, and Vladislava Urazova.  During event finals she placed fourth on the vault and seventh on balance beam.

In July 2018 she competed at the Russian National Championships where she placed fourth in the all-around behind Ksenia Klimenko, Urazova, and Astafyeva.  Additionally she placed fifth on vault, eighth on uneven bars, and second on balance beam and floor exercise behind Urazova.  The following month Vorona competed at the 2018 European Championships alongside Urazova, Klimenko, Astafyeva, and Irina Komnova.  They placed second in the team final behind Italy.

2019
In May Vorona competed at the Russian National Championships where she placed fourth in the all-around behind Vladislava Urazova, Viktoria Listunova, and Elena Gerasimova.  She placed third on vault behind Urazova and Listunova, seventh on uneven bars, sixth on balance beam, and third on floor exercise, once again behind Listunova and Urazova.

In June Vorona was selected as the alternate for the inaugural Junior World Championships.  She won a gold medal in the team final alongside her teammates Listunova, Urazova, and Gerasimova.

In July Vorona competed at the 2019 European Youth Olympic Festival alongside Listunova and Irina Komnova.  While there she helped Russia win the gold in the team final.  During the all-around final she won bronze, finishing behind Listunova and Ondine Achampong of Great Britain.  During event finals she placed fourth on vault and floor exercise.

In August Vorona competed at the Russian Cup, where, although she was a junior, she competed against senior gymnasts.  After two days of competition she finished fifth in the all-around competition, behind fellow junior Urazova, senior competitor Angelina Melnikova, junior Gerasimova, and senior Lilia Akhaimova. During event finals she won gold on balance beam, ahead of the 2019 Junior World Champion on the event, Gerasimova, and Urazova, and placed sixth on uneven bars.

In November Vorona competed at Elite Gym Massilia where she placed first in the all-around, ahead of Listunova, second on uneven bars, and third on balance beam.

Senior

2020 
In late January Vorona was listed on a nominative roster that was released for the Melbourne World Cup, scheduled to take place on February 20.  While there she placed twelfth on balance beam during qualifications and did not advance to the finals.  In March she competed at the Baku World Cup and finished fifth on balance beam and eighth on floor exercise during qualifications and advanced to the event finals for both.  However event finals were canceled due to the COVID-19 pandemic in Azerbaijan.  In late September it was announced that Vorona would be competing at an upcoming competition in Tokyo taking place in November alongside Angelina Melnikova, Elena Gerasimova, and Lilia Akhaimova (later replaced by Aleksandra Shchekoldina.

2021 
Vorona competed at the national championships where she placed sixth in the all-around.  At the Russian Cup she placed seventh.  In September it was announced that Vorona would compete at the upcoming World Championships alongside Angelina Melnikova, Maria Minaeva, and Vladislava Urazova.  While there she only competed on the balance beam.  She fell during the final and placed ninth.

Competitive history

References

External links

 

2004 births
Living people
Russian female artistic gymnasts
Sportspeople from Voronezh
Medalists at the Junior World Artistic Gymnastics Championships